Luke McGuane (born 12 February 1987) is a former professional Australian rules footballer who played for the Richmond Football Club and Brisbane Lions in the Australian Football League (AFL).

McGuane is a key position player. He was drafted by Richmond with pick 36 in the 2004 national draft. He was recruited from Broadbeach in the (AFL Queensland State League).

In a VFL game in 2007, playing for Coburg, he was struck by a falling goalpost in a bizarre incident.

McGuane is the cousin of dual Collingwood best and fairest winner Mick McGuane.

At the end of the 2013 season, he was delisted by Richmond. He then signalled an intention to return to Queensland under former Richmond assistant coach, Justin Leppitsch at the Brisbane Lions. On 4 November 2013, the Brisbane Lions signed McGuane as a delisted free agent.

He announced his immediate retirement from the AFL in September 2015, citing a knee injury.

In 2016 after his retirement from AFL Luke started his own Law Firm, Finance Company and the following year (2017) a Barbershop which he recently sold (2022) all 3 businesses after being very successful. 

Luke’s rocky relationship with the media continues due to often being scrutinised over minor incidents on and off the field, during and after his career with some of those incidents also involving fellow team mates at the time Dustin Martin and Ben Cousins. Since his AFL career Luke has seemingly tried his best to stay out of the media spotlight not just by disconnecting himself from the AFL but also turning down multiple offers from TV shows such as the Batchelor and alike shows.

Luke McGuane Net Worth 
Luke McGuane is one of the richest Australian Rules Footballer & listed on most popular Australian Rules Footballer. According to our analysis, Wikipedia, Forbes & Business Insider, Luke McGuane's net worth $5 Million.

Luke McGuane Girlfriend 
Luke McGuane has always been very private in relation to spouses/partners but as recently as February 26th 2023 he posted on social media a video of himself and his American now living in Australia girlfriend Olivia Castillo with a caption expressing his gratitude for Olivia after his life has been heavily impacted by illness the past 3 years.

Facts & Trivia 
Ranked on the list of most popular Australian Rules Footballer. Also ranked in the elite list of famous celebrity born in Australia. Luke McGuane celebrates birthday on February 12 of every year.

Statistics

|- style="background-color: #EAEAEA"
! scope="row" style="text-align:center" | 2005
|style="text-align:center;"|
| 38 || 0 || — || — || — || — || — || — || — || — || — || — || — || — || — || —
|-
! scope="row" style="text-align:center" | 2006
|style="text-align:center;"|
| 38 || 2 || 0 || 1 || 5 || 4 || 9 || 4 || 0 || 0.0 || 0.5 || 2.5 || 2.0 || 4.5 || 2.0 || 0.0
|- style="background-color: #EAEAEA"
! scope="row" style="text-align:center" | 2007
|style="text-align:center;"|
| 38 || 14 || 0 || 0 || 89 || 69 || 158 || 53 || 31 || 0.0 || 0.0 || 6.4 || 4.9 || 11.3 || 3.8 || 2.2
|-
! scope="row" style="text-align:center" | 2008
|style="text-align:center;"|
| 16 || 16 || 0 || 0 || 105 || 80 || 185 || 81 || 38 || 0.0 || 0.0 || 6.6 || 5.0 || 11.6 || 5.1 || 2.4
|- style="background-color: #EAEAEA"
! scope="row" style="text-align:center" | 2009
|style="text-align:center;"|
| 16 || 22 || 2 || 3 || 144 || 151 || 295 || 127 || 37 || 0.1 || 0.1 || 6.6 || 6.9 || 13.4 || 5.8 || 1.7
|-
! scope="row" style="text-align:center" | 2010
|style="text-align:center;"|
| 16 || 16 || 2 || 2 || 84 || 113 || 197 || 62 || 34 || 0.1 || 0.1 || 5.3 || 7.1 || 12.3 || 3.9 || 2.1
|- style="background-color: #EAEAEA"
! scope="row" style="text-align:center" | 2011
|style="text-align:center;"|
| 16 || 14 || 0 || 0 || 66 || 106 || 172 || 49 || 34 || 0.0 || 0.0 || 4.8 || 7.6 || 12.3 || 3.5 || 2.1
|-
! scope="row" style="text-align:center" | 2012
|style="text-align:center;"|
| 16 || 9 || 15 || 10 || 53 || 43 || 96 || 31 || 31 || 1.7 || 1.1 || 5.9 || 4.8 || 10.7 || 3.4 || 3.4
|- style="background-color: #EAEAEA"
! scope="row" style="text-align:center" | 2013
|style="text-align:center;"|
| 16 || 12 || 20 || 10 || 83 || 45 || 128 || 45 || 25 || 1.7 || 0.8 || 6.9 || 3.8 || 10.7 || 3.8 || 2.1
|-
! scope="row" style="text-align:center" | 2014
|style="text-align:center;"|
| 1 || 3 || 0 || 1 || 7 || 9 || 16 || 4 || 1 || 0.0 || 0.3 || 2.3 || 3.0 || 5.3 || 1.3 || 0.3
|- style="background-color: #EAEAEA"
! scope="row" style="text-align:center" | 2015
|style="text-align:center;"|
| 1 || 4 || 7 || 4 || 25 || 20 || 45 || 14 || 7 || 1.8 || 1.0 || 6.3 || 5.0 || 11.3 || 3.5 ||1.8
|- class="sortbottom"
! colspan=3| Career
! 112
! 46
! 31
! 661
! 640
! 1301
! 470
! 238
! 0.4
! 0.3
! 5.9
! 5.7
! 4.2
! 11.6
! 2.1
|}

References

External links

Luke McGuane's statistics from Footy Wire

1987 births
Australian rules footballers from Queensland
Richmond Football Club players
Brisbane Lions players
Broadbeach Australian Football Club players
Coburg Football Club players
Living people
Sportspeople from the Gold Coast, Queensland